William George Arthur Redmond (born 29 May 1927) is a former Australian rules footballer who played with Carlton in the Victorian Football League (VFL).

Notes

External links 

Bill Redmond's profile at Blueseum

1927 births
Carlton Football Club players
Living people
Australian rules footballers from Melbourne
Williamstown Football Club players
People from North Melbourne